Shaylee Gonzales (born May 2, 2000) is an American college basketball player for the Texas Longhorns of the Big 12 Conference. She previously played for the BYU Cougars.

High school career
Gonzales played basketball for Mesquite High School in Gilbert, Arizona, where she was coached by her mother, Candice. As a junior, she averaged 19.8 points, 5.7 steals and 6.6 assists per game, leading her team to a 31–1 record and its first Class 5A state championship. She was named Arizona Gatorade Player of the Year. In her senior season, Gonzales averaged 21 points, 7.7 rebounds and five steals per game, helping Mesquite reach the Class 5A state title game. A three-star recruit, she committed to playing college basketball for BYU.

College career
In the second round of the 2019 NCAA tournament, Gonzales scored a freshman season-high 32 points in a 72–63 loss to Stanford. As a freshman, she averaged 17 points, 5.6 rebounds and 4.1 assists per game, earning first-team All-West Coast Conference (WCC) and Newcomer of the Year honors. Gonzales was sidelined for her second season with a torn anterior cruciate ligament and meniscus in her right knee. She made her sophomore debut on November 27, 2020, scoring a season-high 30 points in a 67–51 win against LSU. Gonzales averaged 17.8 points, 5.3 rebounds and 3.6 assists per game as a sophomore. She shared the WCC Player of the Year award with Jenn Wirth and repeated as a first-team All-WCC selection. On February 12, 2022, Gonzales recorded a career-high 35 points, seven steals and six assists in an 84–69 win over Saint Mary's. She was named WCC Player of the Year and made the first-team All-WCC for a third time, averaging 18.3 points, 5.9 rebounds and 4.5 assists per game.

After her junior season at BYU and the departure of head coach Jeff Judkins, Gonzales entered the transfer portal. On July 11, 2022, she announced that she would transfer to Texas.

Personal life
Gonzales is the daughter of Josh and Candice Gonzales, both of whom played college basketball for Grand Canyon. Her parents work in real estate and own a home health company. In high school, Gonzales launched Sincerely Shaylee, a photography business. She has a large social media following on platforms including TikTok and YouTube. Gonzales has signed name, image and likeness deals with Mountain America Credit Union, among other companies. In college, she majors in journalism with a focus on sports media.

References

External links
BYU Cougars bio

2000 births
Living people
American women's basketball players
Basketball players from Arizona
People from Gilbert, Arizona
Point guards
Shooting guards
BYU Cougars women's basketball players
Texas Longhorns women's basketball players